Vikramjit Singh Rooprai (born 10 February 1983) is an author, educator and heritage activist. He started his career as a Software Engineer and later became a Digital Marketing Consultant. He left his full time IT job in 2015 and became an Educator, where he establishes Heritage Labs in schools and train teachers on how to use History to teach various subjects. His first book 'Delhi Heritage: Top 10 Baolis', dedicated to the stepwells of Delhi is published by Niyogi Books.

Early life and background 
Vikramjit was born in Manama, Bahrain and has done most of his schooling from Delhi. He attended Green Fields Public School, Guru Harkrishan Public School and Shaheed Bishan Singh Memorial Sr. Sec. School before joining Department of Electronics and Accreditation of Computer Classes 'O' & 'A' Level. He dropped out of 'B' Level from Jagan Institute of Management Studies. Vikramjit won 20+ awards in Information Technology competitions organized by colleges and computer society of India. Vikramjit married Maninder Pal Kaur in 2008. They have a daughter Sartaj Kaur (b. 2010) and son Virpratap Singh (b. 2014).

Career

Software and digital marketing 
Vikramjit started developing professional software while in school. After dropping out of Department of Electronics and Accreditation of Computer Classes 'B' Level, he started working with Sirez Infosystems of Delhi as a Research Analyst. In 2006, he joined Digitas and was soon promoted to Associate Director (Research and Innovation). During his tenure in Digitas, Vikramjit applied for Bachelor of Science (IT) through distance education from Sikkim Manipal University. He later applied for and cleared Masters of Computer Applications from same university. Vikramjit started his own company in 2011 under the name Techno:Cats. He and his team was taken over by arvato services arm of Bertelsmann AG. He worked for arvato India till October 2015, before turning into a full-time Educationist and Historian.

Heritage activism 
In 2009, Vikramjit started his heritage exploration and named the project Didar-i-Dilli. He started Monuments of Delhi, which later became the most accurate and reliable source of information on the Monuments and Rulers of Delhi. In 2010, Vikramjit established The Heritage Photography Club. In 2013, he started Heritage Talks at various monuments, which were later moved to India Habitat Centre. In 2014, he registered his Trust, Youth for Heritage Foundation and started large scale heritage promotion campaigns.

Vikramjit started promoting heritage through photography. He now conducts regular Heritage Walks and Talks across the country including lectures in Schools, Colleges and Universities. He has been on several panel discussions and debates on Sensitive Heritage Issues. His Twitter Handle (@DelhiHeritage) has been listed as a specialized handle for Historic Trivia about Delhi.

As Educationist 
In January 2017, Vikramjit launched Heritageshaala, an education company setting up Heritage Labs in Schools and Colleges across India. Vikramjit is currently a visiting faculty member at the National Institute of Fashion Technology. He also trains teachers throughout India on Experiential Narrative Pedagogy. His company developed card and board games to teach school students. In 2021, Vikramjit received the Innovative Educator of the Year award by ScooNews.

As author 
Vikramjit released his first book "Delhi Heritage: Top 10 Baolis" in August 2019, published by Niyogi Books. He claims it to be the first book dedicated to the stepwells of Delhi. He spent 5 years researching the for the book and was able to obtain archival material from National Archives, Central Archaeological Library, ASI Photo Archives and IGNCA. He provided a list of all 32 stepwells in Delhi, recorded since late 1800s. Out of these, top 10 were discussed in detail, along with 2 special mentions. Baolis covered in his book are:
 Kotla Feroz Shah Baoli
 Red Fort Baoli
 Ridge Baoli
 Hazrat Nizam-ud-Din Baoli
 Ugrasen ki Baoli (also spelled as Agrasen ki Baoli)
 Munirka Baoli
 Gandhak ki Baoli
 Purana Qila Baoli
 Rajon ki Baoli
 Loharheri Baoli
 Baoli of Meherban Agha's Mandi – Arab ki Sarai, Humayun's Tomb Complex
 Hafiz Dawood ki Baoli (also known as Dargah Khawaja Kaki ki Baoli), Mehrauli

The foreword was written by Sohail Hashmi and the book was launched by Sohail Hashmi and Narayani Gupta in Delhi.

References

External links 
 Official website

Educators from Delhi
1983 births
Indian Sikhs
Living people